If I Should Love Again is the eighth studio album released by singer and songwriter Barry Manilow. The album was recorded at United Western Recording Studios in Los Angeles, California. The album was released in 1981, and it was certified gold.

Manilow refers to it as "The most romantic album that I ever made", and remarks "I was so caught up in romance that I actually wrote music and lyrics to the title song while playing the piano facing the ocean, in a rented house on the beach in Atlantic City, New Jersey."

Reception

Bryan Buss of Allmusic retrospectively gave the album three stars (of a possible five), calling it "classic Barry Manilow; shamelessly well-crafted adult contemporary."  He concluded his review by saying "It may not be the biggest album of his career, but If I Should Love Again showcases Manilow's greatest skill: making heartbreak sound hopeful."

Track listing

Side 1
"The Old Songs" (David Pomeranz, Buddy Kaye) - 4:43
"Let's Hang On" (Bob Crewe, Denny Randell, Sandy Linzer) - 3:12
"If I Should Love Again" (Barry Manilow) - 5:33
"Don't Fall in Love with Me" (Barry Manilow, John Bettis) - 3:39
"Break Down the Door" (Barry Manilow, Bob Gaudio, Enoch Anderson) - 3:04

Side 2
"Somewhere Down the Road" (Cynthia Weil, Tom Snow) - 4:00
"No Other Love" (Barry Manilow, Adrienne Anderson) - 4:36
"Fools Get Lucky" (Barry Manilow, John Bettis) - 4:11
"I Haven't Changed the Room" (Barry Manilow) - 2:16
"Let's Take All Night (to Say Goodbye)" (Barry Manilow, John Bettis) - 3:36

1998 CD bonus track
"You're Runnin' Too Hard" (Barry Manilow, Marty Panzer) - 3:00

Cover versions on If I Should Love Again
In 2007, Filipina pop/R&B singer Nina recorded the title track for the re-release of her self-titled album entitled Nina Featuring the Hits of Barry Manilow and released as the album's second single. It peaked at No. 2 on the Philippine charts.
In 2021, Filipina singer and actress Maris Racal recorded the title track for the album Stop Missing You.

Charts

Personnel
Barry Manilow - vocals, piano (tracks 1 and 3-10)
Tom Kelly, Bill Champlin, Richard Page - backing vocals
Robert Marullo - synthesizer (tracks 1, 2, 4 and 6), electric piano
Victor Vanacore - keyboards, acoustic and electric pianos
Bill Mays - keyboards
Dean Parks, Paul Jackson Jr., John Pondel, Mitch Holder - guitars
Will Lee, Carl Sealove - bass
Bud Harner, Ed Greene - drums
Robert Forte, Alan Estes - percussion
String and horn arrangements: Artie Butler tracks 1 and 6, Victor Vanacore tracks 2, 3, 4 and 10, Jimmie Haskell tracks 7 & 8
Tom Scott - saxophone
Sid Sharp - concertmaster
source:

Certifications

References 

Barry Manilow albums
1981 albums
Albums arranged by Jimmie Haskell
Arista Records albums
Albums recorded at United Western Recorders